Moyna College, established in 1972, is a college in Purba Medinipur district. It offers undergraduate courses in arts and sciences. It is affiliated to  Vidyasagar University.

Departments

Science
Chemistry
Physics
Mathematics
Botany

Arts and Commerce
Bengali
English
Sanskrit
History
Political Science
Philosophy
Education

physical education
Commerce

B.Sc(Major)
Agroservice

Accreditation
The college is recognized by the University Grants Commission (UGC).
The college has got B grade by NAAC in 2017.

See also

References

External links
 Moyna College

Colleges affiliated to Vidyasagar University
Educational institutions established in 1972
Universities and colleges in Purba Medinipur district
1972 establishments in West Bengal